White County is a county in the U.S. state of Indiana. As of the 2010 United States Census, the population was 24,643. The county seat (and only incorporated city) is Monticello.

History
The first white settlers in the future White County arrived in the land west of Tippecanoe River in 1829, and in other parts of the county in 1831. This area was part of Carroll County during that period.

By 1833, so many settlers had entered the area that the state legislature were pressured to have a separate county created. On 1 February 1834 the state approved the creation of this county, directing that it be named for Isaac White. Interim commissioners were named and directed to organize the county during the summer of 1834, and to choose a county seat in September. They did so on 5 September 1834, naming Monticello as the future seat, due to its central location. While the county was being organized, it was attached to Carroll County for administrative and judicial purposes.

The county name honored Isaac White of Equality, Illinois, who was killed at the Battle of Tippecanoe in 1811. White was a Colonel in the Illinois militia, who volunteered to serve as a Private in the Indiana militia in the march against Prophetstown. He was placed under the command of Kentucky Maj. Joseph Hamilton Daveiss. The two exchanged swords in a demonstration of mutual respect at Fort Vincennes. In the Battle of Tippecanoe they died together and were buried in a common grave at Battle Ground.

Alterations were made to the county's boundaries on 24 December 1834, on 4 February 1837, and on 14 February 1839. In addition, the counties of Jasper (1837), Pulaski (1839), Newton (1839), and Benton (1840) removed significant portions of the county's territory. The borders have remained unchanged since 1840.

Geography
The low, rolling hills of White County are entirely devoted to agriculture or to urban development. The Tippecanoe River flows southward through the central part of the county. The highest point on the terrain ( ASL) is a gentle rise about  SSE from Wolcott.

Adjacent counties

 Pulaski County - north
 Cass County - east
 Carroll County - southeast
 Tippecanoe County - south
 Benton County - west
 Jasper County - northwest/CST Border

City and towns

 Brookston (town)
 Burnettsville (town)
 Chalmers (town)
 Monon (town)
 Monticello (city/county seat)
 Reynolds (town)
 Wolcott (town)

Census-designated places
 Buffalo
 Idaville
 Norway

Unincorporated places

 Badger Grove
 Bell Center
 Cedar Point
 East Monticello
 Golden Hill
 Guernsey
 Headlee
 Indiana Beach
 Lee
 Round Grove
 Seafield
 Sitka
 Smithson
 Springboro

Townships

 Big Creek
 Cass
 Honey Creek
 Jackson
 Liberty
 Lincoln
 Monon
 Prairie
 Princeton
 Round Grove
 Union
 West Point

Major highways

  Interstate 65
  U.S. Route 24
  U.S. Route 231
  U.S. Route 421
  Indiana State Road 16
  Indiana State Road 18
  Indiana State Road 39
  Indiana State Road 43
  Indiana State Road 119

Railroads
 CSX Transportation
 Toledo, Peoria and Western Railway

Climate and weather

Government

The county government is a constitutional body, and is granted specific powers by the Constitution of Indiana, and by the Indiana Code.

County Council: The legislative branch of the county government; controls spending and revenue collection in the county. Representatives are elected to four-year terms from county districts. They set salaries, the annual budget, and special spending. The council has limited authority to impose local taxes, in the form of an income and property tax that is subject to state level approval, excise taxes, and service taxes.

Board of Commissioners: The executive body of the county; commissioners are elected county-wide, to staggered four-year terms. One commissioner serves as president. The commissioners execute acts legislated by the council, collect revenue, and manage the county government.

Court: The county maintains a small claims court that handles civil cases. The judge on the court is elected to a term of four years and must be a member of the Indiana Bar Association. The judge is assisted by a constable who is also elected to a four-year term. In some cases, court decisions can be appealed to the state level circuit court.

County Officials: The county has other elected offices, including sheriff, coroner, auditor, treasurer, recorder, surveyor, and circuit court clerk. These officers are elected to four-year terms. Members elected to county government positions are required to declare party affiliations and to be residents of the county.

Demographics

2010 Census
As of the 2010 United States Census, there were 24,643 people, 9,741 households, and 6,849 families in the county. The racial makeup of the county was 93.9% white, 0.4% Asian, 0.3% American Indian, 0.3% black or African American, 3.7% from other races, and 1.4% from two or more races. Those of Hispanic or Latino origin made up 7.1% of the population. In terms of ancestry, 27.0% were German, 13.3% were Irish, 9.7% were English, and 8.4% were American.

Of the 9,741 households, 31.3% had children under the age of 18 living with them, 56.1% were married couples living together, 9.3% had a female householder with no husband present, 29.7% were non-families, and 24.8% of all households were made up of individuals. The average household size was 2.50 and the average family size was 2.96. The median age was 41.9 years.

The median income for a household in the county was $47,697 and the median income for a family was $52,626. Males had a median income of $39,715 versus $28,880 for females. The per capita income for the county was $22,323. About 7.7% of families and 9.5% of the population were below the poverty line, including 13.0% of those under age 18 and 4.5% of those age 65 or over.

Education
Public schools in White County are administered by the Frontier School Corporation, North White School Corporation, Tri-County School Corporation and Twin Lakes School Corporation.

High Schools and Middle Schools
 Tri-County Middle/Senior High School
 Frontier Junior-Senior High School
 North White High School
 North White Middle School
 Roosevelt Middle School
 Twin Lakes High School

 Elementary Schools

 Eastlawn Elementary School
 Frontier Elementary School
 Meadowlawn Elementary School
 Monon Elementary School
 Oaklawn Elementary School
 Tri-County Intermediate School

See also
 Meadow Lake Wind Farm
 National Register of Historic Places listings in White County, Indiana

References

External links

 
Indiana counties
1834 establishments in Indiana
Populated places established in 1834
Sundown towns in Indiana